Sweta Singh is an Indian journalist and news presenter. She is a news anchor and Senior Executive Editor of Special Programming at Aaj Tak.

Career
Singh started her career while still in first year of graduate studies in Patna University. She has several bylines to her name in The Times of India Patna edition and Hindustan Times Patna edition, before she switched to electronic media in 1998. She worked for Zee News and Sahara, before joining Aaj Tak in 2002. She is known for her expertise in covering sports-related news. Her show Sourav ka Sixer won the award for best sports programme by Sports Journalism Federation of India (SJFI) in 2005. 
She has also made appearances in some films, like Chak De! India, Chakravyuh and Jhund as an Aaj Tak news presenter. Singh also did the show History of Patliputra during 2015 Bihar Legislative Assembly election.

Singh has been criticized for not questioning the ruling NDA government. In 2016, after the NDA government announced the demonetisation of Indian banknotes, she had incorrectly stated that the then newly introduced Indian 2000-rupee note will contain advanced nanochips.

References

External links
 

Indian opinion journalists
Writers from Patna
Journalists from Bihar
Patna University alumni
Living people
Indian women columnists
Indian columnists
Indian women television journalists
Indian television journalists
Women writers from Bihar
Indian women journalists
Year of birth missing (living people)